Wild Energy is Ruslana's second international English album, released in Canada on 2 September and in Europe on 10 October 2008. Recorded at the legendary Hit Factory Criteria Studios in Miami and produced by Ego Works, the album maintains Ruslana's unique musical components blended with modern urban influences. This release contains a first for Ruslana - a collaboration with the American artists T-Pain and Missy Elliott.
It combines the elements of music, video production, literature and social commitment. Being dedicated to the idea of the independence of human feelings and freedoms using original and rarely heard ethnic sounds, the music blends these ancient styles and singing traditions of the Carpathian Mountain people with modern popular music.

Content
Ruslana's new project takes the listener into a future city which experiences a global energy crisis, far more threatening than lack of oil and gas. The inhabitants of the synthetic city are lacking their will for life, their energy of the heart - the "fuel for people".

The inspiration for the album was the release of the science fiction novel Wild Energy. Lana by Ukrainian authors Maryna and Serhiy Dyachenko in April 2006.

Notwithstanding the fictional character of the plot, it contains allegories which are relevant to our time. According to Ruslana, a heart energy crisis is very likely to take over our society, if creative initiatives are not developed and supported. Ruslana's Wild Energy Project challenges the cultural degeneration, the "Energy Ice Age" of the present.

The "Wild Energy" single and video center around the main character Lana who is desperately trying to get out of the synthetic world, and feature sequences of trick effects, stunts and flights.

Wild Energy combines the art of music and video production, literature and social commentary, and covers the whole creative year of the singer. Gradually singles, videos, album, a fantasy-show, series of comics, social projects and other elements will be presented.

Track listing

Release history

Charts

External links
 EgoWorks

References

Ruslana albums
2008 albums
Concept albums
Warner Records albums